WOKA-FM (106.7 FM) is a country music radio station licensed to Douglas, Georgia, United States. The station is currently owned by Coffee County Broadcasters, Inc. and features programming from Fox News Radio.

References

External links
The Buck website

OKA-FM
Country radio stations in the United States